

See also 2012 in birding and ornithology, main events of 2013 and 2014 in birding and ornithology

The year 2013 in birding and ornithology.

Worldwide

New species

See also Bird species new to science described in the 2000s

 São Miguel scops owl,  a small extinct owl that once inhabited the island of São Miguel, in the Macaronesian archipelago of the Azores, in the North Atlantic Ocean.

Rinjani scops owl, Otus jolandae:
Pincoya storm petrel, Oceanites pincoyae:
Delta Amacuro softtail, Thripophaga amacurensis:
Bermuda flicker, Colaptes oceanicus:
Sao Miguel scops owl, Otus frutuosoi : 
 Seram masked owl, Tyto almae:
Junin tapaculo, Scytalopus gettyae:
Cambodian tailorbird Orthotomus chaktomuk:
Tropeiro seedeater, Sporophila beltoni: 

The following fifteen Brazilian species are described in the 17th volume of the Handbook of the Birds of the World:
Western striolated-puffbird, Nystalus obamai
Xingu woodcreeper, Dendrocolaptes retentus
Inambari woodcreeper, Lepidocolaptes fatimalimae
Tupana scythebill, Campylorhamphus gyldenstolpei
Tapajós scythebill, Campylorhamphus cardosoi
Roosevelt stipple-throated antwren, Epinecrophylla dentei
Bamboo antwren, Myrmotherula oreni
Predicted antwren, Herpsilochmus praedictus
Aripuana antwren, Herpsilochmus stotzi
Manicoré warbling antbird, Hypocnemis rondoni
Chico's tyrannulet, Zimmerius chicomendesi
Acre tody-tyrant, Hemitriccus cohnhafti
Sucunduri yellow-margined flycatcher, Tolmomyias sucunduri
Inambari gnatcatcher, Polioptila attenboroughi
Campina jay, Cyanocorax hafferi
Sierra Madre ground warbler Robsonius thompsoni: 
Guerrero brush-finch  Arremon kuehnerii: 
Omani owl Strix omanensis: 
New Caledonia snipe, Coenocorypha neocaledonica:

Taxonomic developments

Ornithologists

Deaths

World listing

Europe

North America
To be completed

Oceania
 An estimated 3 million short-tailed shearwater (Ardenna tenuirostris) died along the Australian coast, as well as unknown numbers at Lord Howe Island and New Zealand. Necropsies on 172 birds found that 96.7% had eaten pumice with some having thirty small pieces in their stomachs. They were underweight and had poor muscle mass, indicating they were unable to feed properly in the Bering Sea. Starvation may have resulted from a pumice raft from a 2012 underwater volcano north-east of New Zealand and a three-year, marine heatwave in the Bering Sea known as The Blob.

References

2013
Bird
Birding and ornithology by year